Kardemir is a Turkish steel producer.  The name is a contraction of the Turkish language Karabük Demir Çelik Fabrikaları, which means "Karabük Iron and Steel Works".

History
Its main plant is located at Karabük in the Black Sea region of Turkey. Construction of the complex started in 1937 and finished in two years. Power plant was the first plant put into operation in 1939 and other plants became operative successionally within 2 years. Having functioned as a state-owned company for decades, Kardemir was privatized in 1995.

Pollution 
Kardemir burns coal in Turkey. As an integrated steelworks emissions are higher than steel produced at electric arc furnaces. They also own Karabük coal-fired power station. Climate Trace estimates the plant emitted 3.7 million tonnes of carbon dioxide in 2021, more greenhouse gas than any other steelmaker in the country except İsdemir.

Sport sponsorship
Kardemir is the main sponsor of Karabükspor.

See also
List of steel producers 
List of companies of Turkey
List of active coal-fired power stations in Turkey
Greenhouse gas emissions by Turkey

External links
Kardemir official web site

References 

Companies listed on the Istanbul Stock Exchange
Steel companies of Turkey
Manufacturing companies established in 1937
1937 establishments in Turkey
Coal in Turkey
Turkish companies established in 1937
Blast furnaces in Turkey